Jon and Roy is a Canadian three-piece folk rock and reggae band from Victoria, British Columbia.

Career
Singer-songwriter and guitarist Jon Middleton and percussionist Roy Vizer met at University of Victoria. They formed Jon and Roy, and began performing around Victoria and Vancouver in 2003. They added multi-instrumentalist Dougal Bain Mclean in 2004 and recorded their first album, Sittin' Back, in 2005 with recording engineer & producer Stephen Franke.

After traveling together in Australia, Jon and Roy went on hiatus from 2006 to 2007, during which Middleton recorded the solo album, After A Trip, while McLean and Vizer relocated to Vancouver. In 2007, Jon and Roy reformed and the duo recorded the album Another Noon, once again with Stephen Franke, at Blue Heron Studios. The album's title track was featured in a Volkswagen TV commercial that ran for nine months across the United States, giving the group considerable profile in that country. The success of the album also spawned the YouTube hit "Little Bit of Love".

In April 2010, Jon and Roy released Homes. Reviewers stated the music "wants you to get outside, enjoy the sunshine and leave all your material possessions behind." Homes earned them further airtime and exposure, as well as a placement in a six-month Scotiabank ad campaign, in addition to a headlining performance on Canada Day.

With the fourth album, Let It Go, the band were deemed notable, by some critics, for their "folk sound, their light swing rhythm and their predominant use of acoustic instrument."
Their fifth LP, By My Side, released in 2014, was written during jams at Roy Vizer's house.

Discography

Albums
2005  Sittin' Back
2008 Another Noon (2009 US)
2010 Homes
2012 Let It Go
2014 By My Side
2015 Riverside
2017 The Road Ahead is Golden
2019 Here
2021 Know Your Mind

References

External links
Jon and Roy Official website
Official page on Facebook

Musical groups established in 2003
Musical groups from Victoria, British Columbia
Canadian folk music groups
2003 establishments in British Columbia